The 2015 Seattle Sounders FC season was the club's seventh season in Major League Soccer, the United States' top-tier of professional soccer. Including previous Seattle Sounders franchises, this was the 35th season of a soccer team playing in the Seattle metro area.

Background 

The Sounders came into the 2015 season following a successful 2014, winning the U.S. Open Cup for the fourth time as well as winning the Supporters' Shield for the first time in franchise history. By winning the Double, the Sounders became the sixth Major League Soccer team to win two major trophies in one season. This was the first time a club managed to win two trophies since the 2011 Los Angeles Galaxy. It was also the first time since the 2003 Chicago Fire for a team to do the Open Cup/League double.

Seattle also qualified for the 2014 MLS Cup Playoffs for the sixth consecutive time. Seattle came into the playoffs with the ability to become the first MLS club to win the Treble. Seattle ended up losing in the Conference Finals 2-2 on aggregate, losing by away goals.

By virtue of winning the Supporters' Shield, the Sounders qualified for the CONCACAF Champions League after a two-year drought from the competition.

Roster 

Major League Soccer teams are limited to eight players without U.S. citizenship, a permanent resident (green card holder), or the holder of other special status (e.g., refugee or asylum status). These international roster slots can be traded. Sounders FC began the 2015 MLS season with eight international slots; it was announced they traded with DC United for a ninth slot during the Summer Transfer Window.

Competitions

Preseason

Desert Diamond Cup

Major League Soccer

League tables

Western Conference

Overall

Results summary

Results by matchday

Matches

MLS Cup Playoffs

Knockout round

Conference semifinals 

FC Dallas win 4–2 on penalties after 3-3 aggregate and advance to Western Conference Finals.

U.S. Open Cup

CONCACAF Champions League

Group stage

Friendlies

Transfers 

For transfers in, dates listed are when Sounders FC officially signed the players to the roster. Transactions where only the rights to the players are acquired are not listed. For transfers out, dates listed are when Sounders FC officially removed the players from its roster, not when they signed with another club. If a player later signed with another club, his new club will be noted, but the date listed here remains the one when he was officially removed from Sounders FC roster.

In 

Seattle's first signing ahead of the 2015 season was the signing of 17-year-old Victor Mansaray to a Homegrown Player contract. In December 2014, English defender Tyrone Mears was added to the roster as a Discovery Signing; Mears had been a free agent since July when he was released by Bolton Wanderers following the 2013-14 English Championship season. Seattle added All-Pac-12 forward Darwin Jones from the Washington Huskies as a Homegrown Player on January 9, 2015.

Draft picks 

Draft picks are not automatically signed to the team roster. Only those who are signed to a contract will be listed as transfers in. Only trades involving draft picks and executed after the start of 2015 MLS SuperDraft will be listed in the notes.

Out 

On August 13, 2014, it was confirmed that DeAndre Yedlin would be transferred to Tottenham Hotspur of the Premier League for a reported transfer fee of $4 million. Yedlin departed for the English club in January 2015.

Recognition 

 MLS Player of the Week

 MLS Goal of the Week

 MLS Save of the Week

 MLS Team of the Week

Kits

See also 

 Seattle Sounders FC
 2015 in American soccer
 2015 Major League Soccer season

References 

Seattle Sounders FC seasons
Seattle Sounders Football Club
Seattle Sounders Football Club
Seattle Sounders